Nobsin is a town in the Mogtédo Department of Ganzourgou Province in central Burkina Faso. The town has a population of 1,998.

References

Populated places in the Plateau-Central Region
Ganzourgou Province